Liðsmannaflokkr ("household troop's poem") is the title of a skaldic poem in ten stanzas describing the capture of London by Cnut the Great in 1016, preserved in  Óláfs saga helga and Flateyjarbók (fol. 186v), and in   a shorter version in Knýtlinga saga.

Óláfs saga attributes the poem to Olaf himself, while according to Knýtlinga saga, the poem was composed by  members of Canute's household troops during the London campaign. According to Poole (1991), the latter version is more credible.

Stanza 7 praises Cnut's actions in battle, 
Knútr réð ok bað bíða,
baugstalls, Dani alla,
lundr gekk rǫskr und randir,
ríkr, vá herr við díki;
nær vas, sveit þars sóttum,
syn, með hjalm ok brynju,
elds, sem olmum heldi
elg Rennandi kennir.
"Cnut decided and commanded all the Danes to wait; the 'mighty tree of the ring support' (baugstalls lundr ríkr) went  bravely under the shields; the army fought by the moat. 
Lady,
where we sought out the enemy with helmet and mail-shirt, it was nearly as if the 'master of the fire of Rennandi' (elds Rennandi kennir) were holding a maddened elk."

See also
Battle of Assandun
Knútsdrápa

References

Russell Gilbert Poole, Viking Poems on War and Peace: A Study in Skaldic Narrative, issue 8 of Toronto medieval texts and translations, University of Toronto Press (1991), 86-115.
Russell Gilbert Poole, "Lidsmannaflokkr" in: Medieval Scandinavia. An encyclopedia (1993), p. 391.
Jana Krüger, "Wikinger" im Mittelalter: Die Rezeption von víkingr m. und víking f. in der altnordischen Literatur, vol. 56  of Reallexikon der Germanischen Altertumskunde - Ergänzungsbände', Walter de Gruyter (2008), pp. 52-55.

External links
 Pre-Christian Religions of the North: Sources, Aberdeen University.
The Skaldic Project, Aberdeen University.

Skaldic poems
Cnut the Great
11th-century poems